Daniel Radu (born 26 December 1959) is a Romanian boxer. He competed in the men's flyweight event at the 1980 Summer Olympics. Radu also won one national senior title and one bronze medal at the European Amateur Boxing Championships.

References

External links
 

1959 births
Living people
Romanian male boxers
Olympic boxers of Romania
Boxers at the 1980 Summer Olympics
Place of birth missing (living people)
Flyweight boxers